John Blennerhassett (died 4 December 1677) was an Anglo-Irish member of the Irish House of Commons.

Blennerhassett was the son of Captain John Blennerhassett and Martha Lynn. He was probably born at Ballycarty Castle, County Kerry, where his family owned a large estate. He was the brother of Robert Blennerhassett.

He served as High Sheriff of Kerry in 1658. He was elected as Member of Parliament for Tralee in 1661. He married Elizabeth Denny in 1654, with whom he had three children, including the MP John Blennerhassett.

Ancestry

References

Year of birth uncertain
1677 deaths
Irish MPs 1661–1666
High Sheriffs of Kerry
Politicians from County Kerry
17th-century Anglo-Irish people
John
Members of the Parliament of Ireland (pre-1801) for County Kerry constituencies